Peter Trška (born 1 June 1992) is a Slovak professional ice hockey defenceman who currently plays for Fischtown Pinguins of the Deutsche Eishockey Liga (DEL).

Career statistics

Regular season and playoffs

International

References

External links

 

1992 births
Living people
People from Dubnica nad Váhom
Sportspeople from the Trenčín Region
Slovak ice hockey defencemen
VHK Vsetín players
HC Slovan Bratislava players
HK 36 Skalica players
BK Mladá Boleslav players
HC Benátky nad Jizerou players
HC Kometa Brno players
HC Vítkovice players
PSG Berani Zlín players
Fischtown Pinguins players
Slovak expatriate ice hockey players in Germany
Slovak expatriate ice hockey players in the Czech Republic